Joseph or Joe Bradshaw may refer to:
Joseph Bradshaw (VC) (1835–1893), Irish recipient of the Victoria Cross
Joseph Bradshaw (footballer) (1860–1933), English football manager
Joe Bradshaw (footballer) (1884–?), English football manager
Joe Bradshaw (baseball) (1897–1985), American baseball player
Joseph Bradshaw (pastoralist) (1854–1916), Australian pastoralist

See also
 Bradshaw (surname)